Albert Lehman was an American lacrosse player.

He was Jewish.  He played for the St. Louis Amateur Athletic Association.  He won a silver medal in lacrosse at the 1904 Summer Olympics in St. Louis.

References

American lacrosse players
Jewish American sportspeople
Year of birth missing
Year of death missing
Olympic silver medalists for the United States in lacrosse
Lacrosse players at the 1904 Summer Olympics
Medalists at the 1904 Summer Olympics